Mahinaarangi or Mahinārangi may refer to:

Mahinaarangi wharenui, a meeting house at Turangawaewae, the Māori royal marae.
Mahinaarangi Tocker, a New Zealand singer of Māori descent

See also
Lake Mahinerangi, in Otago, New Zealand